Porreres is a municipality on Mallorca, one of the Balearic Islands, Spain.

Notable residents 
Buenaventura Sitjar, missionary and linguist

References

External links 

Porreres.net

Municipalities in Mallorca
Populated places in Mallorca